Macrophiothrix is a genus of brittle stars.

Species 

Macrophiothrix albolineata (H.L. Clark, 1938)
Macrophiothrix albostriata (H.L. Clark, 1928)
Macrophiothrix aspidota (Müller & Troschel, 1842)
Macrophiothrix bellax (Koehler, 1922)
Macrophiothrix belli (Döderlein, 1896)
Macrophiothrix caenosa Hoggett, 2006
Macrophiothrix callizona H.L. Clark, 1938
Macrophiothrix capillaris (Lyman, 1879)
Macrophiothrix coerulea (Djakonov, 1930)
Macrophiothrix demessa (Lyman, 1861)
Macrophiothrix elongata H.L. Clark, 1938
Macrophiothrix encarsia (H.L. Clark, 1939)
Macrophiothrix expedita (Koehler, 1905)
Macrophiothrix galatheae (Lütken, 1872)
Macrophiothrix hirsuta (Müller & Troschel, 1842)
Macrophiothrix hybrida (H.L. Clark, 1915)
Macrophiothrix hymenacantha (H.L. Clark, 1928)
Macrophiothrix koehleri A.M. Clark, 1968
Macrophiothrix lampra H.L. Clark, 1938
Macrophiothrix leucosticha Hoggett, 1991
Macrophiothrix lineocaerulea (H.L. Clark, 1928)
Macrophiothrix longipeda (Lamarck, 1816)
Macrophiothrix lorioli A.M. Clark, 1968
Macrophiothrix martensi (Lyman, 1874)
Macrophiothrix megapoma H.L. Clark, 1938
Macrophiothrix melanosticta (Grube, 1868)
Macrophiothrix michaelseni (Koehler, 1907)
Macrophiothrix nereidina (Lamarck, 1816)
Macrophiothrix nobilis (Koehler, 1905)
Macrophiothrix obtusa (Koehler, 1905)
Macrophiothrix oliveri (Benham, 1911)
Macrophiothrix paucispina Hoggett, 1991
Macrophiothrix pawsoni Liao, 2004
Macrophiothrix propinqua (Lyman, 1861)
Macrophiothrix pulchra (H.L. Clark, 1938)
Macrophiothrix rhabdota (H.L. Clark, 1915)
Macrophiothrix robillardi (de Loriol, 1893)
Macrophiothrix smaragdina (Studer, 1882)
Macrophiothrix speciosa (Koehler, 1898)
Macrophiothrix spongicola (Stimpson, 1855)
Macrophiothrix striolata (Grube, 1868)
Macrophiothrix tenera (Brock, 1888)
Macrophiothrix variabilis (Duncan, 1887)
Macrophiothrix vicina (Koehler, 1930)
Macrophiothrix virgata (Lyman, 1861)

References

Ophiotrichidae
Ophiuroidea genera